Fos (Languedocien: Fòs) is a commune in the Hérault department in southern France.

Winemaking
Fos is one of the seven communes which produces Faugères AOC wine.

Population

See also
Communes of the Hérault department

References

Communes of Hérault